Paradohertya is a monotypic moth genus in the family Erebidae. Its single species, Paradohertya trifascia, is found in Papua New Guinea. Both the genus and species were first described by George Thomas Bethune-Baker in 1904.

References
 

Nudariina
Monotypic moth genera
Moths described in 1904
Moths of New Guinea